The 2008–09 season was APOEL's 69th season in the Cypriot First Division and 81st year in existence as a football club. 

The first training session for the season took take place at the training ground at GSP Stadium on 11 June 2008. APOEL left on 20 June 2008 for Obertraun in Austria to perform the main stage of their pre-season training and returned to Cyprus on 7 July 2008. 

The team finished 2nd in the league in the previous season so the club participated in the UEFA Cup.

On 30 October 2008, Kyriakos Zivanaris (the chairman of APOEL since 2006) resigned and he was replaced by Phivos Erotokritou.

The team won their 20th championship two rounds before the end after an away draw against Anorthosis on 25 April 2009. The draw also put an end to a 16-game winning streak that started on 21 December 2008 on the away game against Doxa Katokopias.

Current squad
Last Update: March 15, 2008

For recent transfers, see List of Cypriot football transfers summer 2008.
 Also, see List of Cypriot football transfers winter 2008–09.

Squad changes

In:

Total expenditure:  €320K

Out:

Total income:  €0
{|

Player stats
Last update: May 10, 2009

Club

Management

Kit

|
|
|

Other information

Preseason friendlies
APOEL left on 20 June 2008 for Obertraun in Austria, to perform the main stage of their pre-season training. The team returned to Cyprus on
7 July 2008. During the pre-season training stage in Austria, APOEL played four friendly matches.

Mid-season friendlies

Competitions

Overall

Marfin Laiki League

Classification

Results summary

Results by round

Playoffs table
The first 12 teams are divided into 3 groups. Points are carried over from the first round.

Group A

Matches
All times for the Domestic Competitions at EET

Regular season

Playoffs

UEFA Cup

First qualifying round

APOEL won 1–0 on aggregate.

Second qualifying round

APOEL 5–5 Red Star Belgrade on aggregate. APOEL won on away goals.

First round

FC Schalke won 5–2 on aggregate.

LTV Super Cup

APOEL won the 2008 Cypriot Super Cup (10th title).

Cypriot Cup

Second round

APOEL won 5–4 on aggregate.

Quarterfinals

APOEL won 4–1 on aggregate.

Semifinals

APOP Kinyras won 2–1 on aggregate.

Notes

References

APOEL FC seasons
APOEL